Peter Stevenhaagen (born April 24, 1965, in Haarlem, North Holland) is a retired road bicycle racer from the Netherlands, who was a professional rider from 1986 to 1992. He rode a total number of five Tours de France during his career.

Tour de France
1986 – 29th
1987 – 45th
1988 – 29th
1989 – 50th
1991 – 94th

During stage 1 of the 1988 edition he wore the green jersey, as after the prologue he was ranked 2nd.

References
 

1965 births
Living people
Dutch male cyclists
Sportspeople from Haarlem
Cyclists from North Holland